Jhalar railway station is  located in District Attock, Punjab, Pakistan on the railway track from Attock City Junction railway station to Basal Junction railway station.

History
The Kotri–Attock Line was opened in 1891. Between Attock and Jhalar railway station, there is a beautiful hilly passage with seven long tunnels. The Jhalar tunnels, also known as "Seven Sisters", were built by the North Western Railway in 1895–97 during the British raj.

Station building and bungalows
There are a few old bungalows and quarters for the railway officials around the station building that were once populated with families but now are just ruins showing the negligence of the railway authorities.

Facilities
The station still lacks electricity. The railway officials working there use solar panels at night for lighting.

Services
Currently the Jhalar station is a stoppage of three trains:
 Jand Passenger
 Khushal Khan Khattak Express
 Attock Passenger

See also
 List of railway stations in Pakistan
 Pakistan Railways

References

External links

Railway stations in Attock District
Railway stations on Kotri–Attock Railway Line (ML 2)